Laurito is a town and comune in the province of Salerno Campania, southern Italy, about 200 km south of Napoli.

See also
Cilento

References

External links

Cities and towns in Campania
Localities of Cilento